Benjamin or Ben Curtis may refer to:
 Benjamin Curtis (musician) (1978–2013), American musician
 Benjamin Robbins Curtis (1809–1874), American jurist
 Ben Curtis (golfer) (born 1977), American golfer
 Ben Curtis (actor) (born 1980), American actor

See also
 Benjamin Curtis Porter (1843–1908), American artist